Tianhe Sports Center South Station is a metro station on the Guangzhou Metro APM line. It is located below the entrance to the Tianhe Sports Center in Tianhe Road in the Tianhe District,  from  station on Line 1 of the metro. It started operation on 8November 2010.

Station layout

Exits

References

Railway stations in China opened in 2010
Guangzhou Metro stations in Tianhe District